JCube is a shopping centre located in Jurong East, Singapore. It is home to Singapore’s first Olympic-size ice rink and the first IMAX theatre in the suburbs. It was built on the former site of the Jurong Entertainment Centre. The name, JCube was decided on after a naming competition held in 2010. J represents the mall’s location in Jurong. Cube represents what JCube was designed to look like - an ice cube.  It was co-designed by RSP Architects and Benoy. It is owned by CapitaMall Trust and managed by CapitaMalls Asia.

History 
Prior to its construction, Jurong Entertainment Centre, a shopping centre, was located on its current site. It was closed for redevelopment in October 2008 and was expected to be completed by 2011. However, due to the financial crisis of 2007–2010 and high construction costs, the redevelopment programme was delayed. The building was completely demolished in February 2010.

On 21 May 2010, CapitaMall Trust held a groundbreaking ceremony for its new mall on the site of the former Jurong Entertainment Centre. The  new mall, named JCube, comprises five levels of retail, two basement levels of car park and a rooftop landscaped plaza.

In 2012, CapitaLand and Singapore Sports Council jointly opened a non-profit Olympic-size ice skating rink, The Rink.

JCube opened and welcomed shoppers on 2 April 2012 and is managed by CapitaMalls Asia.

Due to the opening of Jem and Westgate and declining number of shoppers, J.Avenue, located on Level 2 of JCube, was launched on 6 September 2014. J.Avenue is mainly targeted at the young, and to keep them returning, retail concepts will be constantly updated throughout the year. There are trick art installations so that people can take selfies with interesting backgrounds. Since their target audience, the young, are more tech-savvy, J.Avenue also launched an online portal, featuring some merchandise available at the stores in J.Avenue.

On 7 February 2023, CapitaLand announced that JCube will be redeveloped into a 40-storey residential tower with commercial spaces on the bottom two floors. The new development is slated to be completed in 2027. To facilitate redevelopment, JCube will cease operations at 2200 on 6 August 2023. The change in development is to complement the future Jurong Lake District.

Green initiatives
In 2011, JCube was awarded the Green Mark Platinum award by the Building and Construction Authority in Singapore. It is estimated that the mall will save 7,793,984 kWh/year in energy and 3,419m3/year in water.

References

External links
 

2012 establishments in Singapore
CapitaLand
Shopping malls in Singapore
Jurong East